"Bicycle Repairman" is a postcyberpunk short story by American science fiction writer Bruce Sterling.  It deals with the eponymous character, who lives in a functioning anarchist community in the near future and has an encounter with the misguided authorities.  As is common in Sterling's stories, it deals with issues of markets, governance and the tensions between the two.

"Bicycle Repairman" was first published in Intersections in 1996.  It won a Hugo Award for Best Novelette in 1997.  It was reprinted in a 1999 collection of Sterling's work, A Good Old-Fashioned Future, and again in 2007 in Rewired: The Post-Cyberpunk Anthology.

References

External links 

1996 short stories
Hugo Award for Best Novelette winning works
Science fiction short stories
American novellas
Short stories by Bruce Sterling